Leonardville is a village in Omaheke Region in eastern Namibia. It belongs to the Aminuis electoral constituency.

Leonardville was the main settlement of the Khaiǁkhaun (Khauas Nama) subtribe of the Oorlam people until their military defeat against Imperial Germany's Schutztruppe soldiers in 1894 and 1896.

History
The area around Leonardville was inhabited by the Taa-speaking subtribe of the San people until the Khaiǁkhaun (Red Nation), who called the place Naosanabis, occupied their land. Around 1840 the group around Amraal Lambert, first Kaptein of the Kaiǀkhauan Orlam, moved into the area. They had been granted residence and pasture in the land of the Red Nation against an annual fee. In 1843 the Wesleyan Missionary Society established a missionary station here; its first missionaries were Joseph Tindall and his son Henry. They named the settlement Wesley Vale. In 1855 the Rhenish Missionary Society took over the operations. They bought the existing buildings—the church, the pastor's house, and the forge—and began to run a school for 60 to 80 children.
Amraal Lambert's group, however, searched for a different place to settle. They moved to Gobabis in 1855 or 1856.

Amraal Lambert and most of his family died from smallpox in 1864. Some time after that the Kaiǀkhauan, now under the leadership of Amraal's grandson Andreas, moved back to Naosanabis. From here they controlled important trade routes. Using their technological advantage of commanding  firearms and horses they were waylaying and robbing merchants. In the 1880s the Kaiǀkhauan were considered a powerful and dangerous force.

When Imperial Germany colonised the area a decade later, Lambert refused to sign a "protection treaty". Regarding the Kaiǀkhauan as a comparatively weak force by the Germans, their commander Theodor Leutwein mounted a surprise attack on Naosanabis on 6 March 1894 in order to set an example for the stronger forces in then German South-West Africa not to stand in his way.

The Schutztruppe forces won the battle and expelled the village's residents. The land was given to Angola Boers, farmers who participated in the Dorsland Trek migration movement from South Africa to Angola but decided to turn around and settle in South-West Africa. After the Herero and Namaqua Genocide 1904/05, Isaak Witbooi of the ǀKhowesin (Witbooi Orlam) moved to Naosanabis—the Kaiǀkhauan clan had at that time ceased to exist due to the devastating attack by the Germans. During South African administration the settlement was renamed to Leonardville after Dutch Reformed Church Minister Leonard.

Dutch Reformed Church
The Dutch Reformed Church Leonardville (formerly known as NGK Leonard) was founded on the eleventh day of the eleventh month of 1944 (November 11) as the eleventh church of the Dutch Reformed Church in South Africa (NGK) in what was then South West Africa. Members named it after one of the church's local pioneers, the Rev. (and later Dr.) E.J. Leonard, who ministered across the vast plains on donkey carts and even reached some isolated farms on foot. Founded by around 500 members of the Dutch Reformed Church Gibeon, the congregation grew to a thousand within eight years. By 2010, rural depopulation had reduced the number to a mere 176.

The resulting sprawl was alleviated somewhat by the secession of the Dutch Reformed Church Aroab in 1955. There was originally no congregational seat, so by 1952 it effectively consisted of four different wards, namely Uhlenhorst (140 members), Blumfelde (about 140 members), Aroab (about 360 members), and Pretorius (about 320 members). The parsonage was in Pretorius, and each ward had its own church hall where services were held once a month and communion offered twice a year.

People
Despite the encroachment of Tswana, Orlams, and Boers, there is still a considerable San population. Of the estimated 500 remaining Taa speakers in Namibia, over 50 reside in Leonardville.

Politics
Leonardville is governed by a village council that has five seats.

In the 2010 local election in the village, the ruling SWAPO party won three of the five seats on the village's local council. The Rally for Democracy and Progress (RDP) and the National Unity Democratic Organisation (NUDO) each won a single seat. The 2015 local authority election ended with the same result, three seats for SWAPO, and one each for NUDO and RDP. SWAPO also won the 2020 local authority election with 336 votes and three village council seats. One seat each went to the Landless People's Movement (LPM, a new party registered in 2018, 151 votes) and NUDO (60 votes).

Notable residents
Jan de Wet, Namibian farmer and former politician, settled in Leonardville.

References

Literature
 
 

Populated places in the Omaheke Region
Villages in Namibia